Dasymutilla aureola is a species of velvet ant in the family Mutillidae, found in the western United States.

References

External links

 

Mutillidae
Insects described in 1865